Posht-e Taqehai Chahar Bisheh (also Romanized as Posht-e Tāqehāī Chahār Bīsheh) is a village in Jastun Shah Rural District, Hati District, Lali County, Khuzestan Province, Iran. At the 2006 census, its population was 26, in 4 families.

References 

Populated places in Lali County